Tyldesley is a town in the Metropolitan Borough of Wigan, in Greater Manchester, England. It contains several listed buildings designated by English Heritage and included in the National Heritage List for England. Most are listed at Grade II, the lowest of the three gradings given to listed buildings and is applied to "buildings of national importance and special interest".

The town's listed buildings reflect its history. Three ancient halls in the south and east, Damhouse, Chaddock and Garrett, remain from when Tyldesley was a scattered rural settlement before it developed into an industrial town after 1800. Two places of worship, Top Chapel and the parish church were built as the town's population began to increase as was the former St. George's School, built as a national school in the 1820s of which only its stone-built façade remains. Nikolaus Pevsner describes Tyldesley as "a small industrial town of parallel brick streets" and considers its best building is the "handsome former Union Bank of Manchester" on Elliott Street.

In the United Kingdom "listed building" refers to a building or structure designated as being of special architectural, historical, or cultural significance. They are categorised in three grades: Grade I consists of buildings of outstanding architectural or historical interest, Grade II* includes significant buildings of more than local interest and Grade II consists of buildings of special architectural or historical interest. Buildings in England are listed by the Secretary of State for Culture, Media and Sport on recommendations provided by English Heritage, which also determines the grading.

Key

Buildings and structures

References

Citations

Bibliography

 

Tyldesley
Buildings and structures in the Metropolitan Borough of Wigan
Tyldesley
Listed